Miller County is a county located in the U.S. state of Missouri. As of the 2020 United States census, the population was 24,722. Its county seat is Tuscumbia. The county was organized February 6, 1837 and named for John Miller, former U.S. Representative and Governor of Missouri.

Geography

Adjacent counties
Moniteau County (north)
Cole County (northeast)
Osage County (northeast)
Maries County (east)
Pulaski County (south)
Camden County (southwest)
Morgan County (west)

Major highways
 U.S. Route 54
 Route 17
 Route 42
 Route 52
 Route 87
 Route 134
 Route 242

Demographics

As of the census of 2000, there were 23,564 people, 9,284 households, and 6,443 families residing in the county.  The population density was 40 people per square mile (15/km2).  There were 11,263 housing units at an average density of 19 per square mile (7/km2).  The racial makeup of the county was 97.99% White, 0.28% Black or African American, 0.46% Native American, 0.13% Asian, 0.02% Pacific Islander, 0.29% from other races, and 0.84% from two or more races. Approximately 0.98% of the population were Hispanic or Latino of any race.

There were 9,284 households, out of which 32.60% had children under the age of 18 living with them, 56.00% were married couples living together, 9.20% had a female householder with no husband present, and 30.60% were non-families. 26.10% of all households were made up of individuals, and 11.90% had someone living alone who was 65 years of age or older.  The average household size was 2.50 and the average family size was 3.00.

In the county, the population was spread out, with 26.30% under the age of 18, 8.40% from 18 to 24, 27.40% from 25 to 44, 22.70% from 45 to 64, and 15.30% who were 65 years of age or older.  The median age was 37 years. For every 100 females there were 97.30 males.  For every 100 females age 18 and over, there were 93.70 males.

The median income for a household in the county was $30,977, and the median income for a family was $36,770. Males had a median income of $26,225 versus $18,903 for females. The per capita income for the county was $15,144.  About 10.80% of families and 14.20% of the population were below the poverty line, including 19.30% of those under age 18 and 14.70% of those age 65 or over.

2020 Census

Education

Public schools
Eldon R-I School District – Eldon
South Elementary School (PK-03) 
Eldon Upper Elementary School (04-06) 
Eldon Middle School (07-08) 
Eldon High School (09-12) 
Iberia R-V School District – Iberia 
Iberia Elementary School (PK-06) 
Iberia High School (07-12) 
Miller County R-III School District – Tuscumbia 
Miller County Elementary School (K-08) 
Tuscumbia High School (09-12) 
School of the Osage – Lake Ozark 
Leland O. Mills Elementary School (PK-02) 
Osage Upper Elementary School (03-05) 
Osage Middle School (06-08) 
Osage High School (09-12) 
St. Elizabeth R-IV School District – St. Elizabeth 
St. Elizabeth Elementary School (K-06) 
St. Elizabeth High School (07-12)

Private schools
Lakeview Christian Academy – Lake Ozark (K-10) – Nondenominational Christian 
Our Lady of the Snows School – Eugene (K-09) – Roman Catholic
Eldon Montessori Children's House – Eldon (PK-K) – Nonsectarian
Powerhouse Christian Academy – Iberia (PK-12) – Nondenominational Christian
The King's Academy - Christ the King Lutheran School – Lake Ozark (Preschool-4) – Lutheran

Public libraries
 Heartland Regional Library System

Politics

Local
The Republican Party completely controls politics at the local level in Miller County. Republicans hold all of the elected positions in the county.

State

Miller County is divided into four legislative districts in the Missouri House of Representatives, all of which are represented by Republicans.

District 58 — David Wood (R-Versailles).  Consists of the city of Eldon.

District 59 — Mike Bernskoetter (R-Jefferson City). Consists of the community of Olean.

District 62 — Tom Hurst (R-Meta). Consists of the community of St. Elizabeth.

District 124 — Rocky Miller (R-Lake Ozark).  Consists of most of the county, including the communities of Bagnell, Brumley, Iberia, Kaiser, Lake Ozark, Lakeside, Osage Beach, Tuscumbia, and Ulman.

All of Miller County is a part of Missouri's 6th District in the Missouri Senate and is currently represented by Mike Kehoe (R-Jefferson City).

Federal

All of Miller County is included in Missouri's 3rd Congressional District and is currently represented by Blaine Luetkemeyer (R-St. Elizabeth) in the U.S. House of Representatives.

Political culture

Like most counties in rural western Missouri, Miller County is very Republican. It hasn't supported a Democrat for president since Franklin D. Roosevelt in 1932. The only other time it supported a Democrat in the 20th century was in 1912, when Woodrow Wilson carried the county against a mortally divided GOP. Lyndon Johnson is the last Democrat to garner even 40 percent of the county's vote.

Underlining how Republican the county has been over the years, it rejected native son Harry Truman in 1944 as Roosevelt's running mate, and when he headed the ticket himself in 1948.

Missouri presidential preference primary (2008)

Former Governor Mike Huckabee (R-Arkansas) received more votes, a total of 1,406, than any candidate from either party in Miller County during the 2008 presidential primary.

Communities

Cities and towns

Bagnell
Brumley
Eldon (largest city)
Iberia
Lake Ozark (also in Camden County)
Lakeside
Olean
Osage Beach (mostly in Camden County)
St. Elizabeth
Tuscumbia (county seat)

Unincorporated communities

 Atwell
 Aurora Springs
 Brays
 Capps
 Etterville
 Faith
 Hoecker
 Kaiser
 Keethtown
 Marys Home
 Pleasant Mount
 Rocky Mount
 Saint Anthony
 Spring Garden
 Ulman
 Watkins
 West Aurora

See also
National Register of Historic Places listings in Miller County, Missouri

References

Further reading
 History of Cole, Moniteau, Morgan, Benton, Miller, Maries and Osage counties, Missouri : from the earliest time to the present, including a department devoted to the preservation of sundry personal, business,professional and the private records; besides a valuable fund of notes, original observations, etc. etc. (1889) online

External links
 Digitized 1930 Plat Book of Miller County  from University of Missouri Division of Special Collections, Archives, and Rare Books

 
1837 establishments in Missouri
Populated places established in 1837